The 1946–47 Nationalliga A season was the ninth season of the Nationalliga A, the top level of ice hockey in Switzerland. Eight teams participated in the league, and HC Davos won the championship.

Regular season

Group 1

Group 2

Final

 Zürcher SC - HC Davos 1:8/2:4

Qualification round

 Grasshopper-Club - SC Bern 9:8/6:11

Relegation

 Grasshopper-Club - EHC Chur 5:3

External links
 Championnat de Suisse 1946/47

Swiss
National League (ice hockey) seasons
1946–47 in Swiss ice hockey